Fernando Dente (born January 7, 1990 in Buenos Aires) is an Argentine actor, singer, dancer, theater director and TV presenter. He is known for winning the reality High School Musical: La Selección and later for his main role in High School Musical: El Desafío, for which he competed in the same competition. He was in "tu cara me suena"

Early life 
Fernando has three brothers: Guido, Lucas and Thomas Dente. Since his childhood, Fernando has two great passions: riding, and musical comedy. He studied at the Colegio La Salle in the neighborhood of Flores (in Buenos Aires) and was trained in musical theater and comedy with Hugo Midon (1944–2011). In 2009 his mother, Ada Rizzuti died. Later in March 2014, his father Joseph died as well.

Career in Film and Television

High School Musical: The Selection 
In 2007, Fernando joined the group of twenty selected from 26,000 applicants, who would participate in the reality High School Musical: Selection. This cycle was intended to choose the players for the local film adaptation of Disney High School Musical , High School Musical: El Desafio. On Sunday, October 21, 2007 the end of the cycle took place, in which both Fernando Dente and Agustina Vera became the winners of the cycle after beating Gaston Vietto and Sofia Aguero Petros, earning the right to star Troy and Gabriella in the national version of the film.

High School Musical: El Desafío 
In 2008 he starred in High School Musical: El Desafío. In this film he played a young captain of a rugby team. The film was released on Thursday, July 17, 2008 in Argentina.

Filmography

Discography

Awards and nominations

References 

1990 births
Argentine male actors
Argentine male dancers
Living people
Gay singers
Gay models
Argentine gay actors
Argentine gay musicians
Argentine LGBT singers
Participants in Argentine reality television series
Bailando por un Sueño (Argentine TV series) participants